Rear Admiral Mohammad Lokmanur Rahman, NBP, NGP, ndu, psc is a retired two-star admiral in Bangladesh Navy who served as the Assistant Chief of Naval Staff (Logistics). The Admiral also served as The Administrative Authority Dhaka (ADMIN Dhaka) and previously served as the Director Purchase (Navy) at DGDP.

Early life and education 
Mohammad Lokmanur Rahman was born on 14 February 1964 in Chandpur District to a naval family, the eldest son of Lieutenant Commander Mohammad Sulaiman Mian (1936 - 2016) and Begum Shirin Sultana. He is a second generation naval officer. His father was a freedom fighter who fought in the Bangladesh Liberation War and was one of the pioneer officers who later formed the Bangladesh Navy.

Lokman completed his Secondary School Certificate (SSC) from Karnaphuli Project High School and Higher Secondary School Certificate (HSC) from Comilla Victoria Government College. Later he joined Bangladesh Navy as an officer cadet on 17 July 1983. After two and a half years of military training, he got commissioned on 1 January 1986 from Bangladesh Naval Academy as a Surface Warfare Officer from Logistics Branch with the class of 12th BMA Long Course. Mohammad Lokmanur Rahman did his Supply Officers Basic Course (SOBC) from Bangladesh Navy School of Logistics and Management (SOLAM) at Khulna. He did different naval professional training at home and abroad in his service career.

He is a graduate of Defense Services Command and Staff College, Mirpur. Besides that, he has three master's degree in his credentials. He completed his Master of Defence Studies from National University, Master of Business Administration from Southeast University and Masters in Military Science - National Security Studies from PLA National Defence University, China.

Naval career 
After post commission training, Lokman was appointed in a variety of duties in various capacities in different ranks. He had served in both staff and instructional capacities in different ships, establishments and formation headquarters. Some of those include Logistics Officer of Ships and Establishments, Instructor at Training Schools and Facilities, Selector of Officer Cadre of Bangladesh Armed Forces, Staff Officer to Naval Area Commanders, and Assistant Secretary to Chief of Naval Staff.

He served on-board many Navy ships which include BNS Umar Farooq, BNS Nirbhoy and his mother-ship, BNS Abu Bakr.

He also served as Deputy Director and Director in notable directorates at Bangladesh Naval Headquarters at different times. These includes - Director of  Budget (DOB), Director of Naval Stores (DNS), Deputy Director of Naval Stores (DDNS) etc. 

He served two tenures with the UN, participating in United Nations Peacekeeping Missions. First as a member of military contingent in Georgia in United Nations Observer Mission in Georgia and later in Lebanon as an observer of the naval contingent in United Nations Interim Force in Lebanon.

In his naval career, he has undergone various junior level, midlevel and high level courses at home and abroad. Some of those include: Junior Staff Course, Officer's Selector Course (Bangladesh and Pakistan), Advanced Logistic Course (Pakistan), Military Observer Course, International Defense Management Course, Staff Course, Staff and Command Course (at PLA Naval Command College, China), Defense and Strategic Studies Course (NDU) China, and Senior International Defence Management Course at NPS, California.

Lokman served as acting ACNS (Log) from 21 December 2016 to 26 March 2017 as a Commodore. On 27 March 2018, Lokman was promoted to the rank of Rear Admiral and appointed as the 17th ACNS (Log) of Bangladesh Navy.

Awards and decorations 
Lokman was awarded with the Nou Bahini Padak (NBP) award in 2019 for his service in the Bangladesh Navy. He has also been awarded with the Navy Glorious Service Medal (NGP) by Bangladesh Navy in 2014 in recognition of his service and also the Chief of Naval Staff Commendation Letter and Insignia from the Chief of Naval Staff.

Personal life 

Lokman is married to Shamima Yeasmin Luthia and they have a son, Tahmeed Rahman Taseen and a daughter, Tazreena Rahman Fareeba.

References

External links 

 Official Biography of ACNS (Log) at Bangladesh Navy
 Assistant Chief of Naval Staff Rear Admiral M Lokmanur Rahman in a diplomatic meet with Indian Defence Secretary
 Rear Admiral M Lokman, the special guest in Armed Forces Income Tax Fair 2019
 Commander of the Sri Lankan Navy with Assistant Chief of Naval Staff (Logistics) of the Bangladesh Navy
 Indian Navy Chief Admiral Karambir Singh holding bilateral meetings with Rear Admiral M Lokman, ACNS (Log), Bangladesh Navy

1964 births
Living people
Bangladesh Navy personnel